The Henry Sherry House is a historic house located in Neenah, Wisconsin.

Home with 4-story tower and porte cochere, designed by Waters in High Victorian Gothic style with some Queen Anne decoration and built in 1883. Sherry was a lumberman with interests in northeastern and central Wisconsin. The house was later the home of Hugh Strange of the Strange Lumber Company.

It is a masonry two-story Late Victorian Gothic-style house, upon a limestone ashlar foundation, built in 1883.  It has a four-story square tower.

Henry Sherry was a successful lumberman.

The house was added to the State and the National Register of Historic Places in 1999.

References

Houses on the National Register of Historic Places in Wisconsin
National Register of Historic Places in Winnebago County, Wisconsin
Houses in Winnebago County, Wisconsin
Gothic Revival architecture in Wisconsin
Queen Anne architecture in Wisconsin
Brick buildings and structures
Limestone buildings in the United States
Houses completed in 1883